In mathematics, an implicit equation is a relation of the form  where  is a function of several variables (often a polynomial). For example, the implicit equation of the unit circle is 

An implicit function is a function that is defined by an implicit equation, that relates one of the variables, considered as the value of the function, with the others considered as the arguments.

The implicit function theorem provides conditions under which some kinds of implicit equations define implicit functions, namely those that are obtained by equating to zero multivariable functions that are continuously differentiable.

Examples

Inverse functions
A common type of implicit function is an inverse function. Not all functions have a unique inverse function.

This solution can then be written as

For some functions ,  can be written out explicitly as a closed-form expression — for instance, if , then . However, this is often not possible, or only by introducing a new notation (as in the product log example below).

Algebraic functions

An algebraic function is a function that satisfies a polynomial equation whose coefficients are themselves polynomials.

This algebraic function can be written as the right side of the solution equation . Written like this,  is a multi-valued implicit function.

Algebraic functions play an important role in mathematical analysis and algebraic geometry. A simple example of an algebraic function is given by the left side of the unit circle equation:

Solving for  gives an explicit solution:

Nevertheless, one can still refer to the implicit solution  involving the multi-valued implicit function .

Caveats
Not every equation  implies a graph of a single-valued function, the circle equation being one prominent example. Another example is an implicit function given by  where  is a cubic polynomial having a "hump" in its graph. Thus, for an implicit function to be a true (single-valued) function it might be necessary to use just part of the graph. An implicit function can sometimes be successfully defined as a true function only after "zooming in" on some part of the -axis and "cutting away" some unwanted function branches. Then an equation expressing  as an implicit function of the other variables can be written.

The defining equation  can also have other pathologies. In order to avoid a problem like this, various constraints are frequently imposed on the allowable sorts of equations or on the domain. The implicit function theorem provides a uniform way of handling these sorts of pathologies.

Implicit differentiation
In calculus, a method called implicit differentiation makes use of the chain rule to differentiate implicitly defined functions.

Even when it is possible to explicitly solve the original equation, the formula resulting from total differentiation is, in general, much simpler and easier to use.

Examples

Example 1 
Consider

where the right side is the explicit form of the function . Differentiation then gives . 

Alternatively, one can totally differentiate the original equation:

Solving for  gives

the same answer as obtained previously.

Example 2 
An example of an implicit function for which implicit differentiation is easier than using explicit differentiation is the function  defined by the equation

and then differentiate this function.

It is substantially easier to implicitly differentiate the original equation:

giving

Example 3 
An example is the equation

Using the implicit method,  can be obtained by differentiating the equation to obtain

where . Factoring out  shows that

which yields the result

which is defined for

General formula for derivative of implicit function
If , the derivative of the implicit function  is given by

The above formula comes from using the generalized chain rule to obtain the total derivative — with respect to  — of both sides of :

hence

Implicit function theorem

Let  be a differentiable function of two variables, and  be a pair of real numbers such that .

The condition  means that  is a regular point of the implicit curve of implicit equation  where the tangent is not vertical.

In a less technical language, implicit functions exist and can be differentiated, if the curve has a non-vertical tangent.

In algebraic geometry
Consider a relation of the form , where  is a multivariable polynomial. The set of the values of the variables that satisfy this relation is called an implicit curve if  and an implicit surface if . The implicit equations are the basis of algebraic geometry, whose basic subjects of study are the simultaneous solutions of several implicit equations whose left-hand sides are polynomials. These sets of simultaneous solutions are called affine algebraic sets.

In differential equations
The solutions of differential equations generally appear expressed by an implicit function.

Applications in economics

Marginal rate of substitution

In economics, when the level set  is an indifference curve for the quantities  and  consumed of two goods, the absolute value of the implicit derivative  is interpreted as the marginal rate of substitution of the two goods: how much more of  one must receive in order to be indifferent to a loss of one unit of .

Marginal rate of technical substitution

In this case the absolute value of the implicit derivative  is interpreted as the marginal rate of technical substitution between the two factors of production: how much more capital the firm must use to produce the same amount of output with one less unit of labor.

Optimization

Often in economic theory, some function such as a utility function or a profit function is to be maximized with respect to a choice vector  even though the objective function has not been restricted to any specific functional form. The implicit function theorem guarantees that the first-order conditions of the optimization define an implicit function for each element of the optimal vector  of the choice vector . When profit is being maximized, typically the resulting implicit functions are the labor demand function and the supply functions of various goods. When utility is being maximized, typically the resulting implicit functions are the labor supply function and the demand functions for various goods.

Moreover, the influence of the problem's parameters on  — the partial derivatives of the implicit function — can be expressed as total derivatives of the system of first-order conditions found using total differentiation.

See also

Implicit curve
Functional equation
Level set
Contour line
Isosurface
Marginal rate of substitution
Implicit function theorem
Logarithmic differentiation
Polygonizer
Related rates

References

Further reading

External links
Archived at Ghostarchive and the Wayback Machine: 

Differential calculus
Theorems in analysis
Multivariable calculus
Differential topology
Algebraic geometry